The League of American Writers was a so-called "mass organization" initiated by the Communist Party USA (CPUSA) in 1935 and terminated in January 1943. A small and elite organization, the League included professional novelists, playwrights, poets, journalists, and literary critics. Despite the prominent role of the CPUSA in the establishment and control of the League, one should not make the assumption that any particular individual on this list was a "Communist," however. The members of the League of American Writers ranged from active and open Communist Party members to "fellow travelers" who consciously followed the party's political line without being subject to the formal discipline of party membership to individuals who merely sympathized with one or another broad policy objective being touted by the League, such as stopping the spread of fascism or supporting the cause of the Spanish Republic in the Spanish Civil War. Most members belonged to the latter group.

The office of the League of American Writers was burglarized shortly before the National Council voted to terminate the organization in January 1943 and its membership list was taken. This page is a list of members of the League of American Writers compiled and published by Franklin Folsom, Executive Secretary for five of the seven years of the league's existence. Folsom worked from published League Bulletins, organizational minutes, partial membership lists obtained from the Federal Bureau of Investigation and the House Committee on Un-American Activities, as cross-checked to a similar list compiled by Tom Wolfe for his doctoral dissertation. This list follows that published as Appendix A of Folsom's 1994 memoir.

Membership list

A

 Cyrilly Abels
 Marcel Acier
 Louis Adamic (1899–1951)
 Frederic L. Adams
 Léonie Adams (1899–1988)
 Irving Adler (1913- )
 James Agee (1909–1955)
 Conrad Aiken (1889–1973)
 George Sumner Albee (1905–1964)
 Sidney S. Alberts
 Rhoda Truax Aldrich
 Sidney Alexander
 Benjamin Algase
 Nelson Algren (1909–1981)
 Lewis Allan (1903–1986) 
 William Alland (1916–1997)
 James S. Allen (1906–1991) 
 Jay Allen (1900–1972)
 Sally Elliot Allen
 Sarah Van Alstyne Allen
 Henry Alsberg
 George Ames (1910–?)
 Lou Amster (1910–1993)
 A.E. Anderson
 Maxwell Anderson (1888–1959)
 Sherwood Anderson (1876–1941)
 Ruth Olive Angel
 Charles Angoff (1902–1979)
 Ruth Nanda Anshen
 Katharine Anthony (1877–1965)
 Benjamin Appel (1908–1977)
 Helen Appleton
 Herbert Aptheker (1915–2003)
 Louis Aragon (1897–1982)
 Arthur Arent (1904–1972)
 Eugene Armfeld
 Arnold B. Armstrong
 Louise V. Armstrong
 Thurman Arnold (1891–1969)
 Newton Arvin (1900–1963)
 Nathan Asch (1902–1964)
 Sholem Asch (1880–1957)
 Harriet Ashbrook (1898–1946)
 George Asness
 Leopold Atlas (1907–1954)
 W. H. Auden (1907–1973)
 Nathan Ausubel (1898–1986)

B

 Sanora Babb (1907–2005) 
 Georgia Backus (1900–1983)
 Joe Baich
 J.S. Balch
 Robert Lee Baker
 James Baldwin (1924–1987)
 Emery Balint
 Jenny Ballou
 Margaret Culkin Banning (1891–1982)
 Wayne Barker
 Samuel Barlow (1892–1982)
 Will Barnet
 John D. Barry (1866–1942)
 Dorothy Baruch
 Emjo Basshe (1900–1939)
 Hamilton Basso (1904–1969)
 Ralph Bates
 Marie Baumer
 Joseph Warren Beach (1880–1957)
 Carleton Beals (1893–1979)
 Beril Becker
 Florence Becker Lennon (1895–1984)
 Nancy Bedford-Jones
 Albert Bein
 Nicholas Bela
 Cedric Belfrage (1904–1990)
 Ben Belitt (1911–2003)
 Emile Beliveau
 Thomas Bell (1903–1961)
 Robert C. Benchley (1889–1945)
 M. R. Bendiner
 Agnes E. Benedict (1889–1950)
 Eduard Beneš (1884–1948)
 William Rose Benét (1886–1950)
 Ben Bengal
 Nora Benjamin (1899–1988) 
 Milly Bennett (1909–1989)
 Ria Romilly Benson
 Theodore Bentley
 Rion Leonardo Bercovici (1903–1976)
 José Bergamín
 Josef Berger (1903–1971) 
 Helen Bergovoy
 Martin Berkeley
 Harold Berman
 Lionel Berman (1906–1968)
 Lawrence Bernard (1905–1968)
 Aline Bernstein (1881–1955)
 Joseph Bernstein (1908–1975)
 Samuel Bernstein (1905–1977)
 Alvah Bessie (1904–1985)
 Simon Bessie
 A. I. Bezzerides (1908–2007)
 Herbert Biberman (1900–1971)
 Karl Billinger (1902–1979) 
 Anthony Bimba (1894–1982)
 Louis P. Birk
 Joran Birkeland
 John Peale Bishop (1892–1944)
 Beatrice Bisno
 Edwin Bjorkman (1866–1951)
 Algernon D. Black
 Jean Fergusson Black
 Ivan Black (1904–1979)
 Clarice Blake
 Eleanor Blake
 Ellen Blake
 William J. Blake (1894–1968) 
 Henry Blankfort, Jr.
 Louise Blankfort
 Michael Blankfort (1907–1982)
 Marc Blitzenstein (1905–1964)
 Bruce Bliven (1889–1977)
 Ernst Bloch (1885–1977)
 Anita Block (1882–1967)
 Pauline Bloom
 Frederick A. Blossom (1878–1974)
 Albert E. Blumberg
 Maxwell Bodenheim (1893–1954)
 Harold A. Boner (1904–1971)
 Stephen Bonsal (1865–1951)
 Robert O. Boothe
 Allen Boretz (1900–1986)
 G. A. Borgese
 B. A. Botkin (1901–1975)
 Louis Boudin (1874–1952) 
 Florence W. Bowers
 Herman Boxer
 Ruth Fitch Boyd
 Thomas Boyd (1898–1935)
 Polly Boyden
 Richard Owen Boyer (1903–1973)
 John Boylan
 Ernest Brace
 Robert A. Brady
 Moe Bragin (1900-1986) 
 Millen Brand (1906–1980)
 Mort Braus
 Bertolt Brecht (1898–1956)
 Harvey Bresler
 Bessie Breuer (1893–1975)
 Dorothy Brewster (1883–1975)
 Robert Stephen Briffault (1876–1948)
 John Bright
 Ayers Brinser
 Alter Brody
 Anne Bromberger
 Louis Broomfield (1896–1956)
 J. Bronowski (1908–1974)
 Ernest Brooks
 Jerome E. Brooks (1895–1983)
 Marie Short Brooks
 Phillip Brooks (1899–1975)
 Van Wyck Brooks (1886–1963)
 Heywood Broun (1888–1939)
 Julie Brousseau
 Earl Browder (1891–1973)
 Bob Brown
 Dee Brown (1908–2002)
 John Mason Brown (1900–1969)
 Sterling A. Brown (1901–1989)
 Violet Brown
 Waldo R. Browne
 Herbert Bruncken (1896-unknown)
 Harold Buchman
 Sidney Buchman (1902–1975)
 Nathaniel Buchwlad
 Pearl S. Buck (1892–1973)
 Henrietta Buckmaster (1909–1983)
 Harriet F. Bunn
 Edwin Berry Burgum (1894–1979)
 Fielding Burke (1869–1968) 
 Kenneth Burke (1897–1993)
 Whitney Ewing Burnett (1899–1973)
 Paul Burns
 Stanley Burnshaw (1906–2005)
 Norman Burnside
 Jane Burr
 Struthers Burt
 Paul Burton-Mercur
 Anthony Buttietta
 Harold Witter Bynner (1881–1968)

C

 Harriet Cahn
 Erskine Caldwell (1903–1987)
 Alan Calmer
 Victor Campbell
 Wallace Campbell
 Martha Campion
 Robert Cantwell (1908–1978)
 Harry Carlisle (1910–1966)
 Helen Grace Carlisle
 Walter Carmon
 Cecilio J. Carnicio
 Marjorie Barth Carpenter
 Robert Carse (1902–1971)
 Saul Carson
 Vera Caspary (1904–1987)
 Molly Castle
 John Chamberlain (1904–1995)
 Alene Dalton Chapin (1915–1986)
 Katherine Garrison Chapin (1891–1978)
 John Cheever (1912–1982)
 Ralph Cheney
 Haakon Chevalier (1901–1985)
 Chao-Ting Chi
 Marquis W. Childs (1903–1990)
 Richard S. Childs
 Edward Chodorov (1904–1988)
 Jerome Chodorv
 Mady Christians (1892–1951)
 Henry E. Christman (1906–1980)
 Stoyan Christowe
 Eleanor Clark (1913–1996)
 Maurice Clark
 Faith Clarke
 Eugene Clay
 Albert Edward Clements
 Harold Clurman (1901–1980)
 Robert M. Coates (1897–1973)
 Humphrey Cobb (1899–1944)
 Lee J. Cobb (1911–1976) 
 Stanton A. Coblentz (1896–1982)
 Lester Cohen (1901–1963)
 Charles E. Colahan
 Merle Colby (1902–1969)
 Lester Cole (1904–1985) 
 Eugene Colehan
 Lloyd Collins
 Richard J. Collins
 Louis Colman (1902–1969)
 David Commons
 Groff Conklin (1904–1968)
 Marc Connelly (1890–1980)
 Harry Conover
 Ellen Conried
 Jack Conroy (1899–1990) 
 Aaron Copland (1900–1990)
 Seymour A. Copstein
 Kathryn Coe Cordell
 Lewis Corey (1892–1953) 
 Paul Corey (1903–1993)
 Norman Corwin
 George S. Counts (1889–1974)
 Malcolm Cowley (1898–1989)
 Marian Cox (1898–1983)
 Sidney Cox
 Harold Coy
 C. Ward Crampton
 Bruce Crawford
 Ruth Elizabeth Crawford
 Kyle Crichton (1896–1960) 
 Alexander L. Crosby (1906–1980)
 Caresse Crosby (1892–1970)
 Ken Crossen
 Countee Cullen (1903–1946)
 William Cunningham
 Dale Curran
 Clifton Cuthbert
 Philip Cuthbert

D

 Edward Dahlberg (1900–1977)
 David Daiches (1912–2005)
 James Daly (1918–1978)
 Robert D'Ambry
 H.W.L. Dana (1881–1950)
 George Dangerfield (1904–1986)
 Jerry Danzig
 Danny Dare (1905–1996)
 Marcia Davenport (1903–1996)
 Edward David
 Joy Davidman (1915–1960)
 Frank Davis
 Frank Marshall Davis (1905–1987)
 George Davis
 Horace Bancroft Davis
 Jerome Davis (1891–1979)
 Lavinia Riker Davis
 Robert A. Davis
 Robert Gorham Davis
 Stuart Davis (1894–1964)
 Edward Davison (1898–1971)
 Paul de Kruif (1890–1971)
 Merrill Denison (1893–1975)
 Leon Dennen
 August Derleth (1909–1971)
 Alvara DeSilva
 Margo DeSilva
 Karl William Detzer (1891–1987)
 Albert Deutsch
 Babette Deutsch (1895–1982)
 Peter De Vries (1910–1993)
 Gertrude Diamont
 Pietro di Donato (1911–1991)
 Frieda Meredith Dietz
 George Dillon (1906–1968)
 Howard Dimsdale
 Loren Disney
 Martha Dodd (1908–1990)
 William E. Dodd, Jr.
 James Dombrowski (1897–1983)
 Ambrogio Donini
 Edward Donahoe
 John Dos Passos (1896–1970)
 Clifford Dowdey (1904–1979)
 Olin Downes (1886–1955)
 Muriel Draper (1886–1952)
 Theodore Draper (1912–2006)
 Theodore Dreiser (1871–1945)
 John Drury (1898–1972)
 James Dugan (1912–1967)
 John Dunn
 Robert Dunn (1877–1955)
 Philip Dunne (1908–1992)
 F. W. Dupee (1904–1979)
 Walter Duranty (1884–1957)
 Arnaud d'Usseau (1916–1990)
 Jay du Von

E

 Horace Ainsworth
 Richard Eberhart (1904–2005)
 Irwin Edman (1896–1954)
 David Efron
 Lajor Egri (1888–1967)
 Leonard Ehrlich
 Emilio Ehricos
 Albert Einstein (1879–1955)
 Emanuel Eisenberg
 Alfred Eisner
 Harold Elby
 Edward Eliscu (1902–1998)
 Stella Eliscu
 Peter Ellis
 Ralph Ellison (1914–1994)
 Mary Elting
 Cyril Endfield (1914–1995)
 Guy Endore (1901–1971) 
 Fannie Engle
 Paul Engle (1908–1991)
 H. C. Engelbrecht
 Stuart Engstrand (1904–1955)
 Angna Enters (1907–1989)
 Julius J. Epstein (1909–2000)
 Philip G. Epstein (1909–1952)
 Nathan Essell
 Renie Eulenburg-Weiner
 Mary Cummings Eudy (1871–1952)
 William Everts (1902–1988)
 Frederic Ewen (1899–1988)

F

 Beatrice Faber
 Clifton Fadiman (1904–1999)
 Henry Pratt Fairchild (1880–1956)
 Edward Falkowski (1901-1984)
 John Fante (1911–1983)
 Francis Edward Faragoh
 Finis Farr (1904–1982) 
 James T. Farrell (1904–1979) 
 Howard Fast (1914–2003) 
 Arthur Huff Fauset (1899–1983)
 Jessie Redmon Fauset (1884–1961)
 Franklin Fearing (1892–1962)
 Kenneth Fearing (1902–1961)
 Leon Feinberg
 I.F. Stone (1907–1989) 
 David Fenwick
 Edward Fenwick
 Otis Ferguson (1907–1943)
 Harvey Fergusson (1890–1971)
 Robert Ferrari
 Mathild Ferro
 Theodore E. Ferro
 Lion Feuchtwanger (1884–1958)
 Arthur Davison Ficke (1883–1945)
 Ben Field (US author) (1900-1986) 
 Frederick Vanderbilt Field (1905–2000)
 Kathleen Field
 Sarah Bard Field (1883–1974)
 Allen A. Fields
 Joseph A. Fields (1895–1966)
 Irving Fineman
 Maxine Finsterwald
 Bruno Fischer (1908–1992) 
 Louis Fischer (1896–1970)
 Marjorie Fischer (1903–1961)
 Dorothy Canfield Fisher (1879–1958)
 Vardis Fischer (1895–1968)
 Dudley Fitts (1903–1968)
 Robert Fitzgerald (1910–1985)
 Grace Hodgson Flandrau
 Rose E. Flanell
 Hildegarde Flanner (1899–1987) 
 Charles Flato (1908–1984)
 Ethel Fleming
 John Gould Fletcher (1886–1950)
 Eleanor Flexner (1908–1995)
 Angel Flores
 William Floyd (1871–1943)
 Martha Foley (1897–1977)
 Franklin Folsom
 Betsy Foote
 Diana Forbes-Robertson
 Charles Henri Ford
 Fanya Foss
 Orline Dorman Foster
 William Z. Foster (1881–1961)
 Michael Fraenkel (1896–1957)
 Bernhard Frank
 Waldo David Frank (1889–1967) 
 Erich Franzen
 Frank S. Freeman
 Ira Henry Freeman
 Joseph Freeman (1897–1965)
 Emily Freidkin
 Robert Frost (1874–1963)
 Daniel Fuchs (1909–1993)
 Sol Funaroff (1911–1942) 
 Julian Funt

G

 Joseph Gaer (1893–1946)
 Wanda Gág (1893–1946)
 Lewis Galantiere
 Lewis Gannett (1891–1966)
 Sender Garlin (1902–1999)
 Troy Garrison
 Samuel Gaspar
 John W. Gassner (1903–1967)
 Michael Gates
 Mary Gawthorpe (1881–1973)
 Virgil Geddes (1897–1989)
 Lawrence Gellert (1898-c. 1979)
 Martha Gellhorn (1908–1998)
 Manfred Georg
 Thomas Gerson
 Robert Gessner (1907–1968)
 Sheridan Gibney (1904–1988)
 Elsa Gidlow (1898–1986)
 Helen Earle Gilberta
 Leland Gilbert
 Mercedes Gilbert (1894–1952)
 Lauren Gilfillan (1909–1978)
 Lillian Barnard Gilkes
 Strickland Gilliland
 Mildred Gilman
 Arnold Gingrich (1903–1976)
 Louis Ginsberg
 Dorothy Glaser
 Baruch Glassman
 Charles Glenn
 Lillian G. Glenn
 H. H. Glintenkamp
 Alexander Godin
 Michael Gold (1894–1967) 
 David A. Goldberg
 Nan Golden
 Beatrice Goldsmith
 Morton S. Goldstein
 Lawrence A. Goldston
 Joseph Gollomb (1881–1950)
 Manuel Gomez (1895–1950) 
 Henry Goodman
 Francis Goodrich
 Murray Goodwin
 Don Gordon (1911–1974)
 Eugene Gordon (1891–1974)
 Ruth Gordon (1896–1985) 
 Quentin P. Gore
 Jay Gorney (1894–1990)
 Harry Gottlieb (1895–1993)
 James Gow (1908–1952)
 Emmett Gowen
 Isacque Graeber (1905–1984)
 Oskar Maria Graf (1894–1967)
 Edith Grafton
 Samuel Grafton
 Harry Granick
 Morton Grant
 Mark Graubard
 James Gray (1899–1984)
 Bernard Grebanier (1903–1977)
 Johnny Green (1908–1989)
 Sara Greenhill
 Richard Greenleaf
 David Charles Greenwood
 Horace Gregory (1898–1982)
 William Lindsay Gresham (1909–1962)
 Jay Greulich
 Hilda Growald
 Antoni Groniwicz
 Louis Grudin (1898–1993)
 Martha Gruening
 Leo Grulio
 Bernhard G. Guerney (1894–1979)
 Frances Gunther
 John Gunther (1901–1970)
 Ramon Guthrie (1896–1973)
 Norbert Guterman (1900–1984)

H

 Louis Hacker (1899–1987)
 Albert Hackett (1900–1995)
 Carl Haessler (1888–1972)
 J. B. S. Haldane (1892–1964)
 Emanuel Haldeman-Julius (1889–1951)
 Stuart Halden
 Hope Hale
 Mauritz A. Hallgren (1899–1956)
 Albert Halper (1904–1984)
 Maurice Halperin (1906–1995)
 Florence Hamilton
 Dashiell Hammett (1894–1961)
 Frederic Hand
 John Handcos
 Harry Hansen (1884–1977)
 Merlin Hansen
 Louis Harap (1904–1998)
 E. Y. Harburg (1896–1981)
 Rachel Harlen
 Jessie Fauset Harris (1882–1961)
 M. Tjader Harris
 Reed Harris (1909–1982)
 Alan Harrison
 W. E. Harrison
 Robert Harron
 Henry Hart (1903-1990)
 Marian Hart (1892–1940)
 Moss Hart (1904–1961)
 Walter Hart (1906–1973)
 Gwendolen Haste
 Clarence Hathaway (1892–1963)
 Walter Havighurst (1901–1994)
 Elizabeth Hawes (1903–1971)
 Willard Hawkins
 Edith Garrigues Hawthorne
 Alfred Hayes (1911–1985)
 Howard Hays
 Hofman Reynolds Hays (1904–1980)
 David Hedley
 Ethel McCall Head
 Nora Helgren
 George S. Hellman
 Lillian Hellman (1905–1984)
 Ernest Hemingway (1898–1961)
 Leon Srabian Herald
 Josephine Herbst (1897–1969)
 Angelo Herndon (1913–1997)
 Robert Herrick (1868–1938)
 John Herrmann (1900–1959)
 Melville J. Herskovits (1895–1963)
 David Hertz
 Allan Hewitt
 DuBose Heyward (1885–1940)
 Granville Hicks (1901–1982)
 James Hill (1916–2001)
 Norman E. Himes
 Alfred Hirsch
 Peretz Hirschbein (1880–1948)
 Wilder Hobson (1906–1965)
 Edward Hodes
 Carroll Hollister
 Eugene C. Holmes
 Hope Holway
 Milton Howard
 Sidney Howard (1891–1939)
 Quincy Howe (1900–1977)
 Leo Huberman (1903–1968)
 Warren C. Huddlestone
 B. W. Huebsch
 Edward Huebsch
 Harriet Hughes
 Langston Hughes (1902–1967)
 Rolfe Humphries (1894–1969)
 Alice Riggs Hunt (1884-1974)
 Ian McLellan Hunter
 Herman Hurlbut
 Fannie Hurst (1899–1968)
 Leo T. Hurwitz
 John Marcellus Huston (1906–1987)
 Grace Hutchins (1885–1969)

I

 Agatha Illes
 Boris Ingster
 Theodore Irwin
 Sulamith Ish-Kishor (1896–1977)
 Eitaro Ishigaki
 Joris Ivens (1898–1989)

J
 Aunt Molly Jackson (1880–1960)
 Gardner Jackson
 Lewis Jacobs (1904–1997)
 Eli Jaffe
 Eugne Jaffe
 Henry Jaffe
 Bernard Jaffee
 Paul Jarrico (1915–1997)

K
 Philip Keeney

M
 Archibald MacLeish
 Arthur Miller

O
 Shaemas O'Sheel

P
 Myra Page

R
 Sonia Raiziss

S
 Vincent Sheean
 John Steinbeck
 I. F. Stone

T
 Alexander Trachtenberg
 Lawrence Treat

U
 Louis Untermeyer

Footnotes

See also

 League of American Writers

Communist Party USA
Lists of American writers